Bruno Cadoré OP is a French Catholic priest of the Dominican Order who headed the Order from 2010 to 2019.

Cadoré is a trained physician, with specialization in the field of bioethics.

Biography
Bruno Cadoré was born in Le Creusot, France, in 1954. He was a medical doctor before entering the Dominican novitiate in 1979. He made profession in the order in 1980, and was ordained a priest in 1986, earning a doctorate in moral theology in 1992. Prior to his election as Master of the Order, Cadoré had been Prior Provincial of the Dominican Province of France. He has also served as director of the Medical Ethics Center of the Université Catholique de Lille. 

He was elected to a nine-year term as the 87th Master of the Order of Preachers at the General Chapter of the Order in Rome, on 5 September 2010, which made him ex officio Grand Chancellor of the Pontifical University of St. Thomas Aquinas, Angelicum. During his term of office as Master of the Order, Cadoré was the chancellor of Colegio de San Juan de Letran and the University of Santo Tomas in Manila, Philippines. Upon completion of his nine-year mandate, Cadoré was succeeded by Gerard Timoner.
He is the author of With Him: Listening to the Underside of the World (Bloomsbury Continuum 2019)

References

1954 births
Living people
People from Le Creusot
French Roman Catholic priests
French Dominicans
Masters of the Order of Preachers
Presidents of universities and colleges in the Philippines